Parchim International Airport  is an unscheduled airport in North-Eastern Germany, serving Schwerin and Parchim in the west of Mecklenburg-Vorpommern.

History
Originally a Third Reich-era Luftwaffe air force base, hosting the pioneering JG 7 jet fighter wing before May 1945, it saw scheduled cargo flights operated by Air Cargo Germany in 2009 and 2010. As of June 2015, a Chinese investor wanted to extend logistic operations. However its subsequent role has been the storage of surplus airliners, predominantly Airbus models formerly registered in China.

References

External links
 Official website

Parchim
Buildings and structures in Ludwigslust-Parchim